The Fort Myers Downtown Commercial District is a U.S. historic district (designated as such on January 26, 1990) located in Fort Myers, Florida. The district is bounded by Bay and Lee Streets, Martin Luther King Jr. Blvd and Monroe Street. It contains 69 historic buildings.

Thomas Edison and Henry Ford both had summer homes off of McGregor Boulevard, which is located near the Downtown District.  Tours of their estates are available.

References

External links

 Lee County listings at National Register of Historic Places
 

National Register of Historic Places in Lee County, Florida
Historic districts on the National Register of Historic Places in Florida
Geography of Lee County, Florida
Buildings and structures in Fort Myers, Florida
Tourist attractions in Fort Myers, Florida